The Royal Norwegian Navy is the branch of the Norwegian Armed Forces responsible for naval operations of the state of Norway. , the RNoN consists of approximately 3,700 personnel (9,450 in mobilized state, 32,000 when fully mobilized) and 69 vessels, including 4 frigates, 6 submarines, 6 corvettes, 3 minesweepers, 3 minehunters, 3 support vessels and 2 training vessels. The navy also includes the Coast Guard.

In Norwegian, Royal Norwegian Navy vessels have since 1946 been given the ship prefix "KNM", short for Kongelig Norske Marine (Royal Norwegian Navy). In English, they are given the prefix "HNoMS", short for "His/Her Norwegian Majesty's Ship" ("HNMS" could be also used for the Royal Netherlands Navy, for which "HNLMS" is used instead). Coast Guard vessels are given the prefix "KV" for KystVakt (Coast Guard) in Norwegian and "NoCGV" for Norwegian Coast Guard Vessel in English.

Navy

Submarines
The submarine flotilla is planned to be replaced/updated with four new submarines from 2029. Norway has joined forces with Germany to develop the Type 212CD-class of submarines.

Surface combatants
The fifth Fridtjof Nansen-class frigate, HNoMS Helge Ingstad, sunk in a collision off Bergen, Norway in 2018 and has been decommissioned.

Mine countermeasures vessels and 2X Hugin UAV on a 20" container

Auxiliary ships
It was decided that due to delays on HNoMS Maud the two former inner coast guard vessels NoCGV Olav Tryggvason and NoCGV Magnus Lagabøte (both from the Reine-Class), would be transferred to the navy as auxiliary vessels.

Coast Guard

Outer Coast Guard

Inner Coast Guard

Intelligence Service

References
Royal Norwegian Navy Official web site

Royal Norwegian Navy
Ships of the Royal Norwegian Navy
Ships of the Norwegian Coast Guard
Norway
Norway